The Standard Electric automobile was an electric car manufactured by the Standard Electric Car Company in Jackson, Michigan from 1912 to 1915.

History 
The Standard Electric used Westinghouse electric motors and claimed to have a range of 110 miles on a charge.  It was operated by a tiller from the left-hand side.  The controller had six forward speeds, and had a top speed of 20-mph.  The model M was a closed model Coupe or open Runabout, and priced from $1,785 to $1,900, .

In 1913 the company name was changed to Standard Car Manufacturing Company.  In November 1915, Standard Car closed and sold their plant to Benjamin Briscoe who moved in to build his Argo cyclecar.

References

External Links 
 Standard Electric at ConceptCarz.com

Defunct motor vehicle manufacturers of the United States
Motor vehicle manufacturers based in Michigan
Defunct manufacturing companies based in Michigan
Vehicle manufacturing companies established in 1911
Vehicle manufacturing companies disestablished in 1915
Cars introduced in 1911
Electric vehicle manufacturers
Electric vehicles
Brass Era vehicles
1910s cars